Irasavadi is a village in Chamarajanagar district of Karnataka state, India.

Location
Irasavadi village is located between Chamarajanagar town and Yelandur town. The nearby villages are Rechamballi and Kagalvadi.

Postal code
There is a post office at Irasavadi and the pin code is 571441.

Geography
The terrain is generally flat and there is a lake called Irasavadi Lake

Economy
The village is mostly agrarian.  There is a branch of Indian Overseas Bank at Kagalvadi.

Access
The village is 16 km from Chamarajanagar, the district headquarters.  Bangalore is 143 km away.

Nearby villages
Suthur, 2 km
Boodamballi, 2 km
Yeragamballi, 2 km
Honganuru, 3 km
Duyamkandalli, 3 km

See also
 Rechamballi
 Kagalvadi
 Yelandur
 Chamarajanagar

References

Villages in Chamarajanagar district